CONCANACO is Mexico's Confederation of the National Chambers of Commerce. Along with its counterpart CONCAMIN, it is a public institution with complete autonomy that coordinates and represents the local chambers of commerce (CANACO's) before the Federal Government. Its main tasks are to encourage the private sector to invest in new business opportunities in the country and to promote Mexico's tourism industry. CONCANACO's current president is José Manuel López Campos, appointed on 28 March 2014.

References

External links
 

Tourism in Mexico
Business organizations based in Mexico
Organizations established in 1917